God of Love is the sixth studio album by the American musical group Bad Brains. It is the band's first album since I Against I, released in 1986, with its original lineup. It was released in 1995 on Maverick Records.

The release contains their usual mix of hardcore punk/metal and reggae, though with more the latter than any other Bad Brains album. The heavy-rock oriented title track received video airplay on MTV.

Backed by huge promotion from the label and an opening slot on the Beastie Boys' Ill Communication tour, the band fell apart as the volatile singer, H.R., was arrested several times; he was involved in beating a skinhead, a security guard, and the band's manager in separate incidents during the tour. The band missed a performance at Madison Square Garden with Beastie Boys due to H.R.'s behavior, leading to yet another breakup. The band reunited in 1997.

This album was re-released on Record Store Day, April 16, 2011, as only 2,000 copies along with a 7".

Track listing
"Cool Mountaineer" 
"Justice Keepers" 
"Long Time" 
"Rights of a Child" 
"God of Love" 
"Over the Water" 
"Tongue Tee Tie" 
"Darling I Need You"
"To the Heavens" 
"Thank Jah"
"Big Fun" 
"How I Love Thee"

Personnel
Bad Brains
H.R. – vocals
Dr. Know – guitar
Darryl Jenifer – bass
Earl Hudson – drums

Production
Christopher Shaw – engineer
Ric Ocasek – producer

References

External links
Bad Brains official website

1995 albums
Bad Brains albums
Maverick Records albums
Albums produced by Ric Ocasek
Albums recorded at Electric Lady Studios